Plainsburg (formerly, Plainsberg and Welch's Store) is an unincorporated community in Merced County, California.

A post office operated at Plainsburg from 1869 to 1907.

References

Unincorporated communities in California
Unincorporated communities in Merced County, California